The Wrath of Silence is a 1994 Hong Kong comedy film directed by Frankie Chan.

Cast
 Anita Yuen
 Takeshi Kaneshiro
 Lap-Man Tan
 Hoi-Lun Au
 Maggie Siu
 Wai-Lun Duen
 Emily Kwan

References

External links
 

1994 films
1990s comedy horror films
Hong Kong comedy films
Hong Kong horror films
Cantonese-language films
1994 comedy films
Films directed by Frankie Chan
1990s Hong Kong films